Sonny Pike (born 1983) is an English former footballer who became famous at a young age for his talent, which saw him being compared to players regarded as among the greatest of all time, such as Diego Maradona and George Best.  Despite his early promise, Pike left the game at the age of 18 without ever having played professionally.

Early life
Pike was born and raised in Enfield. He joined Enfield Colts  at the age of 6, moving to Enfield F.C. at the age of 10.

Career
Pike received much publicity when he went on trial with Dutch club Ajax in 1995; though the club wanted to sign him, he returned to England to sign for Leyton Orient instead. A proposed move to Chelsea fell through, and he later went on trial with both Queens Park Rangers and Crystal Palace before signing with Stevenage Borough. He had a trial at Grimsby Town, before quitting football at the age of 18.

There were reports in the media that he had a non-league career at clubs such as Barnet and Waltham Forest under an assumed name, or that he was playing in Dundee, but Pike has denied those reports.

Later career
In 2016 Pike was working as a taxi driver in London.  In February 2020 he opened a football academy.  He is married with two children.  He continues to be cited by the football media as the archetype of a heavily promoted child prodigy who ultimately did not achieve success in the sport.

References

1983 births
Living people
English footballers
Enfield F.C. players
Leyton Orient F.C. players
Stevenage F.C. players
Association footballers not categorized by position
Footballers from the London Borough of Enfield
British taxi drivers